The Dutch Championships are organised by the KNSB.

In 1887 the first Dutch open championships took place in Slikkerveer. The men skated one distance, the Dutch mile. In the final the Englishmen Charles Tebbit the Dutch skater Willem-Jan van Vollenhoven (the great-grandfather of Pieter van Vollenhoven. The first official Dutch Allround championships  took place in 1901 in Leeuwarden. The champion became Eeko Banning.

The Dutch Allround Championships for women has been organised since 1955, when only 3 distances were skated.

Since 1969 there is also organised a Dutch Sprint championship and since 1987 also a Dutch Single Distance championship.

Championships
KNSB Dutch Allround Championships
KNSB Dutch Sprint Championships
KNSB Dutch Single Distance Championships
KNSB Dutch Super Sprint Championships
Dutch National Kortebaan Speed Skating Championships

Other Championships
KNSB Dutch Marathon Championships Natural ice
KNSB Dutch Marathon Championships Artificial ice
KNSB Dutch Short Track Championships

References

Speed skating in the Netherlands